Howard H. Cherry Scout Reservation is a Boy Scouts of America reservation in the Hawkeye Area Council near Waubeek, Iowa. The reservation has two camps, Camp Waubeek and Camp Wakonda and primarily serves the Hawkeye Area Council and the Winnebago Council.

Camps

Camp Waubeek 
Camp Waubeek is the originally used area within the reservation. The camp is now minimally used. Some of the facilities include a dining hall, a medics quarters, and various other small shelters.
During the summer, the camp is used for a week youth training program call NYLT. Also, cub day camp for three Rivers used the camp. 
For the off season the camp is used for wildness survival training and other programs.

Camp Wakonda 
Camp Wakonda is the currently used camp for most activities. Boy Scout, Cub Scout, and special camps are held in June–August every summer. The camp includes many large facilities.

Dakin Dining Hall 
The Dakin Dining Hall is very large, and can hold up to 350 people at a time. The Dining Hall also has a large kitchen and food storage area. An addition to the Dining Hall is the Blankenship Medical Pavilion, which added three rooms for medicinal purposes, and a large storage room for tables and chairs.

References

Local council camps of the Boy Scouts of America
Protected areas of Linn County, Iowa
Central Region (Boy Scouts of America)
Summer camps in Iowa